The following is a list of Grammy Awards winners and nominees from Senegal:

References

Senegalese
 Grammy
Grammy